Phalodi Assembly constituency is one of constituencies of Rajasthan Legislative Assembly in the Jodhpur Lok Sabha constituency.

List of members

References

http://164.100.153.26/result2018/Rpt_Result_ConstituencyWise_Detail.aspx?cid=122&rURL=1

See also
Member of the Legislative Assembly (India)

Jodhpur district
Assembly constituencies of Rajasthan